Captives in American Indian Wars could expected to be treated differently depending on the identity of their captors and the conflict they were involved in. During the American Indian Wars, indigenous peoples and European colonists alike frequently became captives of hostile parties. Depending on the specific instances in which they were captured, they could either be held as prisoners of war, abducted as a means of hostage diplomacy, used as countervalue targets, enslaved, or apprehended for purposes of criminal justice.

History

Cultural background 

Treatment applied to European captives taken in wars or raids in North America varied according to the culture of each tribe. Before European colonization, the indigenous peoples of the Americas had developed customs for dealing with captives. Depending on the region, captives could either be killed, tortured, kept alive and assimilated into the tribe, or enslaved. When indigenous tribes came into contact with European settlers, they applied longstanding customary traditions for dealing with indigenous captives to the white colonists. Conflicts between indigenous tribes and European settlers resulted in captives being taken on both sides; while the westward expansion of the United States and subsequent conflicts with Native Americans also resulted in many white and Indian captives being taken. Captivity narratives were often written by European-Americans and European-Canadians who were ransomed or escaped from captivity.

King Philip's War 

In King Philip's War, a three-year conflict between indigenous peoples of New England and New England colonists, captured Native Americans were frequently sold into slavery in the West Indies by the colonists. Many friendly Native Americans were enslaved and sent to the West Indies as well.

Cultural differences 
In the eastern woodlands cultural area (roughly encompassing the eastern one-half of the United States, and the southern portion of Quebec and Ontario), cultural traditions for dealing with captives predated the arrival of Europeans, and involved either adoption or execution by torture.

Some captives were adopted into their captors' tribe. Adoption frequently involved the captive receiving the name of a deceased member of the captors' tribe, and receiving the deceased's social status (becoming a member of the family of the deceased person). Children and teenage girls seem to have been normally adopted.

Male and female captives as well as teenage boys, would usually face death by ritual torture.  The torture had strong sacrificial overtones, usually to the sun.  Captives, especially warriors, were expected to show extreme self-control and composure during torture, singing "death songs", bragging of one's courage or deeds in battle, and otherwise showing defiance.  The torture was conducted publicly in the captors' village, and the entire population (including children) watched and participated. Common torture techniques included burning the captive, which was done one hot coal at a time, rather than on firewood pyres; beatings with switches or sticks, jabs from sharp sticks as well as genital mutilation and flaying while still alive. Captives' fingernails were ripped out. Their fingers were broken, then twisted and yanked by children.  Captives were made to eat pieces of their own flesh, and were scalped and skinned alive. Such was the fate of Jamestown Governor John Ratcliffe. The genitalia of male captives were the focus of considerable attention, culminating with the dissection of the genitals one slice at a time. To make the torture last longer, the Native Americans and the First Nations would revive captives with rest periods during which time they were given food and water.  Tortures typically began on the lower limbs, then gradually spread to the arms, then the torso.  The Native Americans and the First Nations spoke of "caressing" the captives gently at first, which meant that the initial tortures were designed to cause pain, but only minimal bodily harm.  By these means, the execution of a captive, especially an adult male, could take several days and nights.

In contrast to the Eastern Woodlands tribes, peoples of the Northwest Coast (encompassing the coastal regions of Oregon, Washington, British Columbia, and southeastern Alaska), enslaved war captives. Slaves were traded and were a valuable commodity.  More importantly, enslaved captives were given as gifts during a potlatch ceremony to enhance the prestige of the gift giver. Some scholars believe that slaves performed major economic roles in this region and comprised a permanent social class and a significant proportion of the population, though this has proved to be controversial.

Pontiac's War 

Henry Bouquet set out from Fort Pitt on October 3, 1764, with 1,150 men during the chaos of Pontiac's War. After that, treaties were negotiated at Fort Niagara and Fort Detroit; the Ohio Natives were isolated and, with some exceptions, ready to make peace. In a council which began on 17 October, Bouquet demanded that the Ohio Natives return all captives, including those not yet returned from the French and Indian War. Guyasuta and other leaders reluctantly handed over more than 200 captives, many of whom had been adopted into Native families. Because not all of the captives were present that day, the Natives were compelled to surrender hostages as a guarantee that the other captives would be returned. The Ohio Natives agreed to attend a more formal peace conference with William Johnson, the Superintendent of Indian Affairs, which was finalized in July 1765.

See also 
 Prisoner of war

References 

People of the wars between the United States and Native Americans
People of indigenous conflicts in Canada
Captives of Native Americans